Joseph Mulrey McIntyre (born December 31, 1972) is an American singer-songwriter and actor. He is best known as the youngest member of the pioneering boy band, New Kids on the Block. He has sold over one million records worldwide as a solo artist and worked in film, television, and stage, including performing on Broadway.

Early life
McIntyre was born in Needham, Massachusetts and raised in the Jamaica Plain neighborhood of Boston, Massachusetts, United States. His parents were Thomas McIntyre, a union official, and his wife Katherine (née Bowen) a community theater actress. His mother died on November 30, 2014, after a long battle with Alzheimer's. His father died on November 12, 2018. He is the youngest of nine children with older siblings, Judy, Alice, Susan, Tricia, Carol, Jean, Kate, and Tommy. He was raised in an Irish-American Catholic family. McIntyre graduated from Catholic Memorial School in West Roxbury, Massachusetts, an all-male Catholic private school. He shares the same birth date as his sister, Carol. Another one of his sisters, Judy, is an actress.

Artistic career

New Kids on the Block
In 1985, just before his 13th birthday, he joined New Kids on the Block, replacing Jamie Kelly. Since the other four members of the band were already long-time school friends, he initially found it difficult to mesh with them. They eventually became one of the most successful boy bands of the late 20th century, producing two number one albums on the US Billboard charts. In 1991, Forbes listed the band as the highest-earning entertainers, beating Madonna and Michael Jackson. They split in 1994, but they reunited in 2008 and have remained active since.

Solo career
Following their split, McIntyre busied himself with songwriting and sought a solo recording contract. He made his acting debut in the film The Fantasticks, which was based on the long-running off-Broadway musical. This 1995 film, starring Joel Grey and Jean Louisa Kelly, was released in theatres five years later.

Disenchanted by his inability to find a recording contract, McIntyre used his own money to record his first solo album Stay the Same and sold it on his website. He then chose the album's title track as a single and took it to local Boston DJs, which eventually garnered the song national airplay. The combination of airplay and website sales for the single led to him signing a recording contract in 1999 with Sony Music USA, under the C2 label, a subsidiary of Columbia Records, which had previously been home to New Kids on the Block. The album was re-released on Sony's Work Records and sold more than a million copies around the world and the single "Stay The Same" peaked at No. 10 in the Billboard Hot 100.  The second single from the album was "I Love You Came Too Late".

Also in 1999, McIntyre recorded the song "Remember Me" for the film Southie, which starred former bandmate Donnie Wahlberg. In 2001, McIntyre released his second solo album, Meet Joe Mac, but it did not chart. "Rain" was the only single released from this album.

In 2004, McIntyre released his fourth solo album, 8:09, followed by Talk To Me, an album of cover versions, in December 2006.

In April 2008, the New Kids on the Block reunited. The single "Summertime" was released in May 2008. Their first full-length album in fourteen years was released on September 2, 2008, titled The Block. On September 18, 2008, they kicked off their reunion tour. In 2009, they began a 'Full Service' summer tour. They toured with Backstreet Boys in 2011.

On November 17, 2009, McIntyre released the single and video "Here We Go Again" from his upcoming EP of the same name. It was produced by Brent Paschke, Gabe Lopez, and Drew Ryan Scott. Paschke, Lopez and Scott also share cowriting with McIntyre on the project. The EP was released on iTunes in December 2009.

In November 2011, McIntyre released a Christmas album titled Come Home for Christmas. The album features a collaboration with fellow New Kid Jordan Knight on "Peace on Earth" and includes holiday classics such as "Winter Wonderland", "Do You Hear What I Hear?" and "The Christmas Song".

On October 23, 2020, McIntyre returned with the song "Own This Town", his first solo release since 2011's Come Home for Christmas. He said of the song, "I wrote this song years ago, with a totally different intention. To me it’s about taking your shot, swinging for the fences, going for it. And I think it really takes on a new meaning now".

Acting
McIntyre played Jon in Jonathan Larson's Tick, Tick... BOOM! for both the off-Broadway (Fall 2001) and national tour (2003) versions of the play. In 2002, he appeared for a season on the television program Boston Public. The following year, he released the live acoustic album One Too Many with Emanuel Kiriakou.

In 2004, he starred in the film Tony n' Tina's Wedding alongside Mila Kunis and also played Fiyero, the leading male role in the Broadway musical Wicked for which he received rave reviews. He replaced Norbert Leo Butz on July 20, 2004, and remained with the show until January 9, 2005, where he was later replaced by David Ayers. He also competed on the first season of the reality television show Dancing with the Stars, winning third place with dance professional partner Ashly DelGrosso.

McIntyre appeared as Fonzie in Happy Days, a musical based on the hit TV show at the Falcon Theater in Los Angeles from February 15 to March 12, 2006, and a second run from June 23 to August 13, 2006. McIntyre appeared in the film On Broadway, which was filmed in his hometown of Boston.

In 2007, McIntyre appeared as Gary in Christmas at Cadillac Jacks. It played around Christmas of that year on The Hallmark Channel and other various Christian channels and recently became available on DVD.

On November 2, 2011, McIntyre guest starred on an episode of the detective comedy Psych. The title of the episode is "The Amazing Psych-Man & Tap Man, Issue #2" – season 6, episode 4.

In 2013, McIntyre appeared in the American buddy cop comedy The Heat, as Peter Mullins, brother of Detective Shannon Mullins, played by Melissa McCarthy. In 2014, McIntyre appeared in the CBS TV sitcom The McCarthys, playing Gerard McCarthy. In 2016, he appeared on the Netflix comedy, Fuller House with all of the members of New Kids on the Block. Then later in season 5 episode 18 in the final show of the series of Fuller House, titled "Our Very Last Show, Again", he appeared as himself officiating the triple wedding of the three main couples.

On February 4, 2019, McIntyre returned to Broadway as the character Dr. Pomatter in the musical Waitress and he continued in this role until April 7, 2019.

On March 24, 2022, McIntyre originated the role of "Johnny" in the new musical production of "The Wanderer" at the Paper Mill Playhouse in Millburn, NJ.  He continued in this role for the duration of the show's run until April 28, 2022.

Other endeavors
In 2001, he hosted a season of MTV's Say What? Karaoke from Las Vegas, Nevada.

Beginning in December 2006, McIntyre took part in Dancing with the Stars – The Tour with actor Joey Lawrence, pop star Drew Lachey and TV stars Lisa Rinna and her husband Harry Hamlin.

On April 15, 2013, McIntyre competed in the Boston Marathon, in which he ran to raise awareness of Alzheimer's in honor of his mother, who died on November 30, 2014. He finished with a time of 3 hours and 57 minutes, just minutes before a bomb exploded and killed three and injured many more.

On October 24, 2017, McIntyre released the first episode of his podcast "The Move with Joey McIntyre", where he interviews guests about their most memorable moving experience and what was going on in their lives at the time.

On May 5, 2021, McIntyre announced on an Instagram Live Stream - along with Debbie Gibson - the release of the highly expected collaborative single "Lost In Your Eyes. The Duet" (June 4, 2021); they also announced a mini residence in Las Vegas, a 4-night limited engagement at the Venetian Resort (August 26, 27, 28 & 29, 2021)

Personal life
McIntyre married Barrett Williams on August 9, 2003, one year after they met. They have three children, one of whom has congenital hearing loss.

Discography

Albums

Singles

Other songs
 2009: "5 Brothers and a Million Sisters"

See also
New Kids on the Block

Notes

Filmography
 1995: The Fantasticks
 1999: All That
 2002–2003: Boston Public
 2003: Johnny Bravo
 2004: Tony n' Tina's Wedding
 2005: Love, Inc.
 2006: Less Than Perfect
 2007: On Broadway
 2007: Christmas at Cadillac Jack's
 2011: CSI:NY
 2011: Psych
 2011: New Year's Eve
 2013: Motive
 2013: 90210
 2013: Newsreaders
 2013: The Heat
 2014: The Hot Wives of Orlando
 2014–2015: The McCarthys
 2016: Angel from Hell
 2016: Angie Tribeca
 2016, 2020: Fuller House
 2017: Return of the Mac
 2022: The Goldbergs
 2023: Dawn

Theater productions
1995: Barking Sharks
2000–2001, 2003: Tick, Tick... BOOM!
2004–2005: Wicked
2006: Happy Days
2013: The Kid
2017: A Funny Thing Happened on the Way to the Forum
2018: Cabaret (in Alaska)
2019: Waitress
2020: Twelfth Night
2022: The Wanderer

References

12. https://people.com/parents/joey-mcintyre-introduces-son-rhys-edward-and-opens-up-about-his-severe-hearing-loss/

External links
 
 Joey McIntyre New Official Site
 McIntyre biography about Stay the Same

1972 births
Living people
20th-century American male actors
20th-century American singers
21st-century American male actors
21st-century American singers
American male film actors
American male musical theatre actors
American male singers
American people of Irish descent
Atlantic Records artists
Catholic Memorial School alumni
Catholics from Massachusetts
Male actors from Boston
Musicians from Boston
New Kids on the Block members
Nightclub owners
NKOTBSB members
Participants in American reality television series
People from Jamaica Plain
People from Needham, Massachusetts
Singers from Massachusetts